Mina canta Napoli is a compilation album by Italian singer Mina, issued by Italdisc in 1966.

Actually the album was entitled Canta Napoli - 20 Successi 20 and was composed of 20 tracks, 8 of which were sung by Mina (but it was the first time they were collected in an album, except "'Na sera 'e maggio" and "Sciummo"). The other songs were:
"'O russo e 'a rossa" (performed by Gianni Ales)
"Chella 'llà" (performed by Gino Ravallese) 
"Core 'ngrato" (performed by Angelo Prioli) 
"Tu vuò fà l'americano" (performed by Gianni Ales)
"Scalinatella" (performed by Quartetto Radar) 
"Serenatella sciuè sciuè (performed by Gino Ravallese)
"Maria Marì" (performed by Duo Festival)
"Lazzarella" (performed by Gino Ravallese)
"Santa Lucia luntana" (performed by Quartetto Radar) 
"Torna" (performed by Angelo Prioli) 
"Guaglione all'estero" (performed by A. Labardi) 
"Dicitencello vuje" (performed by Angelo Prioli)

Track listing

1966 compilation albums
Mina (Italian singer) compilation albums